Dr. Charles Frederick Winslow (30 June 1811 – 7 July 1877) was a physician, diplomat, author, and scientist born in Nantucket, Massachusetts. He received his medical degree from Harvard Medical School in 1834.  He is the author of "Force and Nature", an early work on atomic theory. He served as a physician in Lahaina, Maui, Hawaii from 1844 to 1847, and also in Nantucket, Massachusetts. He was appointed U.S. Consul at Payta, Peru, a noted whaling port, in 1862. He died July 7, 1877. After his death, he was cremated in Salt Lake City, Utah, on July 31, 1877.  This was the second recorded cremation in U.S.history. His heart is buried in Nantucket, in the Newtown Burial Ground. His ashes are buried with his wife's remains in Cambridge, Massachusetts.

Books 
Cosmography, or the Philosophical View of the Universe (1853)

Preparation of the Earth for Intellectual Races (a transcription of a lecture to the California Assembly) (1854)

The Cooling Globe (1865)

Forces of Nature: Attraction and Repulsion (1869)

References

Sources
 Winslow Family Papers, collection 166, Nantucket Historical Association, Research Library and Archives
 Biography of Charles Frederick Winslow 
   has an unsympathetic biography.

External links
 Charles F. Winslow's grave marker, Newtown Cemetery, Nantucket from the Nantucket Historical Association Cemetery Inscription Database
The Intriguing Seamen's Hospital, p. 122–125

1811 births
1877 deaths
Harvard Medical School alumni
19th-century American diplomats
Physicians from Hawaii
People from Nantucket, Massachusetts